The Carsey School of Public Policy at the University of New Hampshire is located in Huddleston Hall, on the campus of the University of New Hampshire in Durham. Carsey offers masters degrees in Public Policy (MPP), Public Administration (MPA) and Community Development (MCD). The school also publishes approximately 40 policy-relevant briefs per year and facilitates constructive dialogue on divisive public policy issues.

History
University of New Hampshire alumna Marcy Peterson Carsey, a 1966 cum laude graduate in English literature and the producer of such television shows as The Cosby Show, Roseanne, Grace Under Fire, 3rd Rock from the Sun, and That '70s Show, established the Carsey Institute through a financial gift to the University in May 2002. In 2013, Marcy Carsey gave a second gift of $20 million to the University of New Hampshire to establish a school of public policy. This gift is the second largest in UNH’s history.

In June 2014, Founding Director Michael Ettlinger joined the Carsey School of Public Policy, arriving from his post as a senior director at the Pew Charitable Trusts.

Publications and research
The Carsey School of Public Policy produces briefs that analyze complex data on pressing issues grounded in real-world conditions and tied to current policy debates. The publications program offers high quality, powerful resources to decision-makers. Carsey School publications offer historical perspective, incorporate the most recent data available, and explore policy implications. Current areas of interest include racial and economic equality, the impact of COVID-19, public finance, sustainable community development and finance, vulnerable families, demographics, clean energy and the environment, and civic engagement.

The Carsey School also publishes a variety of briefs specific to New Hampshire, including analyses of changing demographics in rural, northern New Hampshire, and examinations statewide support for a paid family and medical leave program. Additionally, the Carsey School is now in charge of publishing the signature research publication What is New Hampshire? The goal of What is New Hampshire? is to provide a clear picture of where New Hampshire has been, where it is today, and where it might be heading in the future by presenting objective data, charts, and graphs on issues ranging from the state economy and demographic makeup to the funding of New Hampshire public education.

Academic programs
The Carsey School offers several graduate degrees, including a Master in Public Policy, a Master in Community Development Policy and Practice, and a Master of Public Administration. Master in Public Policy students can also pursue a Master in Public Policy/Juris Doctor. In addition to its graduate degrees, the Carsey School offers a certificate program in community development finance and public facilitator training through New Hampshire Listens.

Master in Community Development 
The Carsey School’s Master of Arts in Community Development Policy and Practice program teaches students the basis of community development, providing them foundations in effective and sustainable community development practices and instructing them on how to apply these skills across different sectors, including housing, health, finance, business development, and more. Designed for working professionals, this online degree at Carsey allows students to earn their Master in Community Development in 14 months.

Master in Public Policy 
The Carsey School’s Master in Public Policy program offers students the necessary tools to make a difference and create change in the challenging environment of 21st-century policymaking. Students learn how to develop transformative policies through research and analysis, and how to strategically communicate those policies to bring their ideas to fruition. This applied program connects students to the policy world through a Washington, D.C., trip, as well as internships and a capstone project. The Master in Public Policy degree at Carsey can be earned in 14 months.

Master of Public Administration 
The Carsey School’s Master of Public Administration program teaches students to effect change at the community and organizational levels. Students learn through a variety of hands-on opportunities, including a capstone project conducted with an organization of their choice. Classes are offered online throughout the year and can be taken full-time or part-time around busy work schedules. The Master of Public Administration degree at Carsey can be completed in 16 months.

Research centers and programs 
The Carsey School oversees or contributes to a variety of programs and research centers, including New Hampshire Listens, the Center for Impact Finance, and the Changemaker Collaborative.

New Hampshire Listens 
New Hampshire Listens is a civic engagement program located at the Carsey School. The program focuses on bringing together New Hampshire residents to talk about issues of regional and national importance. The organization Everyday Democracy serves as a national partner.

NH Listens is built on earlier work by its founding directors and community partners, including community-based dialogue and engagement in Portsmouth leading to the creation of Portsmouth Listens in 1999. The program utilizes small-group facilitated conversations to engage participants in intensive, informed discussions of problems or challenges identified by community members. NH Listens works at the community, regional, and state levels. The program strives to function as trusted and impartial conveners. NH Listens does not advocate for specific outcomes or actions in any of its public engagement work.

In 2017, NH Listens received an American Civic Collaboration Award, a Civvy, for its efforts to strengthen communities.

Center for Impact Finance 
The Center for Impact Finance (CIF) currently serves as an impact finance clearinghouse, bringing together a range of public and private sector organizations for timely information, training, and applied research projects. Carsey's CIF is led by Michael Swack, a teacher, trainer, project director, and researcher with more than 35 years of experience in the field. In 2019, Swack received the Ned Gramlich Lifetime Achievement Award for Responsible Finance from the Opportunity Finance Network.

CIF's staff and fellows are highly regarded researchers and practitioners uniquely qualified to work across multiple disciplines, addressing the complex issues surrounding impact finance.

Changemaker Collaborative 
The Changemaker Collaborative (formerly the Center for Social Innovation and Enterprise) at UNH is a joint partnership of UNH’s Sustainability Institute, the Peter T. Paul College of Business & Economics, and the Carsey School of Public Policy.

Funders 
The Carsey School is funded through the support of philanthropic institutions, public and non-profit agencies, individuals, and a founding gift endowed by Marcy Carsey. Some of the school's funders include Annie E. Casey, Everyday Democracy, Carnegie Corporation of New York, JPMorgan Chase Bank, NASA, National Science Foundation, U.S. Department of Education, Volunteer NH, Washington Center for Equitable Growth, The Mastercard Foundation, Regional Economic Development Center, and many other foundations and private donors.

Notable faculty 
David Finkelhor, senior fellow and a Master in Public Policy professor; American sociologist known for his research into child sexual abuse and related topics
Jake Sullivan, senior fellow and a Master in Public Policy professor; former senior policy advisor to Hillary Clinton's 2016 U.S. presidential election campaign
Kenneth Johnson, senior Demographer and Sociology professor; Awarded the Andrew Carnegie Fellowship to advance research in social sciences and humanities 
Michael Ettlinger, founding director of the Carsey School of Public Policy; former senior director for the Fiscal and Economic Policy Portfolio at The Pew Charitable Trusts
Michael Swack, director of the Center for Impact Finance and professor for the Carsey School and Peter T. Paul College; former dean of the School of Community Economic Development at Southern New Hampshire University

Fellowships 
The Carsey School offers research fellowships to graduate and undergraduate students at UNH.

Governor John G. Winant Fellowship 
The Winant fellowship program was established at the University of New Hampshire in 1982 in memory of New Hampshire Governor John Gilbert Winant (1889-1947) to encourage the professional development of undergraduates with a strong commitment to public service.

Fellowship recipients receive a stipend of $4,000 for full-time summer work (300 hours to be completed anytime between mid-May and late-August) with a nonprofit organization or government agency of their choice, and recipients are recognized for their award in university publications.

Judge William W. Treat Fellowship 
The Treat Fellowship program was established at the University of New Hampshire in 2018 in memory of the late New Hampshire Judge William W. Treat to provide students a platform for engaging in civil discourse around difference.

Fellowship recipients receive a stipend of $1,000 for a semester for the active engagement in the program (100 hours to be completed by the end of the semester) with NH Listens.

Nordblom Summer Fellowship 
The Carsey School of Public Policy Nordblom Summer Fellowship was established through the generosity of Peter C. Nordblom '80 and Kristin Van Curan Nordblom '83. Both are graduates of the University of New Hampshire, earning their bachelor's degrees in history and art, respectively.

The gift provides a summer fellowship to an outstanding graduate student working with the Carsey School at UNH on research relevant to New Hampshire's North Country and the Greater Plymouth area. The recipient will work with Carsey–affiliated faculty and research staff who are experts in youth policy and programs to analyze trends and conditions of rural youth, identifying effective program outcomes and community organizations working in northern New Hampshire.

S. Melvin Rines Fellowship 
S. Melvin Rines (UNH ’47 graduate) created the S. Melvin Rines Fellowship at the Carsey School of Public policy to help prepare students for a rewarding career and future leadership roles within the finance field in Africa. The Fellowship provides a partial tuition award to students who enroll in the Master in Community Development program at the Carsey School. The Melvin Rines Fellowship Successful candidates must be committed to Africa’s development and demonstrate outstanding academic and professional achievement, as well as effective teamwork and leadership potential.

References

University of New Hampshire
2002 establishments in New Hampshire
2014 establishments in New Hampshire